List of Ministers of Housing, Territorial Planning and Environment of Uruguay since 1990:

External links
 Uruguayan Ministry Housing, Territorial Planning and Environment 

 
Housing, Territorial Planning and Environment
Environment ministers
Environment of Uruguay
Housing in Uruguay